A counting quantifier is a mathematical term for a quantifier of the form "there exists at least k elements that satisfy property X".
In first-order logic with equality, counting quantifiers can be defined in terms of ordinary quantifiers, so in this context they are a notational shorthand.
However, they are interesting in the context of logics such as two-variable logic with counting that restrict the number of variables in formulas.
Also, generalized counting quantifiers that say "there exists infinitely many" are not expressible using a finite number of formulas in first-order logic.

Definition in terms of ordinary quantifiers 

Counting quantifiers can be defined recursively in terms of ordinary quantifiers.

Let  denote "there exist exactly ". Then

Let  denote "there exist at least ". Then

See also 
Uniqueness quantification
Lindström quantifier

References 

 Erich Graedel, Martin Otto, and Eric Rosen. "Two-Variable Logic with Counting is Decidable." In Proceedings of 12th IEEE Symposium on Logic in Computer Science LICS `97, Warschau. 1997. Postscript file 

Quantifier (logic)